Alexander Meadows Rendel   (1910–1991) was a British diplomat and solicitor who also served as a Special Operations Executive agent in Crete during World War II, rising to the rank of major.

Rendel was commissioned in the Royal Artillery in May 1940. In early 1943, he met Colonel Thomas Dunbabin,  a fellow former student at Corpus Christi College, Oxford, in Cairo and Dunbabin recruited him to SOE. Rendel arrived in Crete in September 1943, after being appointed in charge of the easternmost Lasithi region. He was known to Cretans as Alexis.

After the war, Rendel worked as a diplomatic correspondent for The Times. He was made a Commander of the Order of the British Empire (CBE) in the 1975 Birthday Honours. 

His son was the Liberal Democrat MP David Rendel.

References

1910 births
1991 deaths
British Army General List officers
British Army personnel of World War II
British Special Operations Executive personnel
Cretan Resistance
Royal Artillery officers
The Times journalists
Commanders of the Order of the British Empire